The 2010–11 Saudi Professional League (known as the Zain Professional League for sponsorship reasons) was the 35th season of the Saudi Professional League, the top Saudi professional league for association football clubs, since its establishment in 1976. The season began on 14 August 2010, and ended on 20 May 2011. Al-Hilal were the defending champions. The league was contested by the 12 teams from the 2009–10 season as well as Al-Faisaly and Al-Taawoun, who joined as the promoted clubs from the 2009–10 First Division. No teams were relegated the previous season following the decision to increase the number of teams from 12 to 14.

On 29 April, defending champions Al-Hilal won their thirteenth League title with two games to spare after a 1–0 home win over Al-Raed. Al-Hilal ended the season without a single defeat – the first team ever to do so in a 26-game league season and the second team overall (the first was Al-Ettifaq in 1983, during an 18-game league season).

Al-Hazem were the first team to be relegated following a 2–0 away defeat to Al-Taawoun. Al-Wehda became the second and final team to be relegated following the decision to dock 3 points from them.

Overview

Changes 
The Saudi FF announced that the number of teams in the league would be increased from 12 to 14.

Qualification and Prize money 
The League champions, runners-up and third place as well as the winner of the King Cup of Champions qualified for the 2012 AFC Champions League.

The top six teams, and the Crown Prince Cup winners and runners-up qualified for King Cup of Champions.

Prize money:

 First place: 2.5 million SAR
 Second place: 1.5 million SAR
 Third place: 1 million SAR

Teams
Fourteen teams competed in the league – the twelve teams from the previous season and the two teams promoted from the First Division. No teams were relegated the previous season following the decision to increase the number of teams from 12 to 14. The promoted teams were Al-Faisaly (returning after an absence of three years) and Al-Taawoun (returning after an absence of thirteen years).

Stadiums and locations

Personnel

Managerial changes

Foreign players
The number of foreign players is restricted to four per team, including a slot for a player from AFC countries.

Players name in bold indicates the player is registered during the mid-season transfer window.

League table

Results

Season statistics

Scoring

Top scorers

Hat-tricks 

Notes
4 Player scored 4 goals(H) – Home team(A) – Away team

Most assists

Clean sheets

Discipline

Player 
 Most yellow cards: 10
 Ahmed Mubarak Kano (Al-Fateh)

 Most red cards: 2
 Fuad Al-Mutairi (Al-Hazem)
 Moïne Chaâbani (Al-Qadisiyah)
 Juliano Mineiro (Najran)

Club 
 Most yellow cards: 71
 Al-Ettifaq

 Most red cards: 11
 Al-Hazem

Attendances

By team

Awards

Arriyadiyah and Mobily Awards for Sports Excellence
The Arriyadiyah and Mobily Awards for Sports Excellence were awarded at the conclusion of the season for the fifth time since its inception in 2007. The awards were sponsored by Saudi newspaper Arriyadiyah and Saudi telecommunication company Mobily. The awards were presented on 11 September 2011.

Al-Riyadiya Awards
The Al-Riyadiya Awards were awarded for the second time since its inception last year. The awards were presented on 15 June 2011.

Best Goalkeeper:  Hassan Al-Otaibi (Al-Hilal)
Best Defender:  Osama Hawsawi (Al-Hilal)
Best Midfielder:  Mohammed Noor (Al-Ittihad)
Best Attacker:  Nasser Al-Shamrani (Al-Shabab)
Player of the Year:  Hassan Al-Otaibi (Al-Hilal)

See also 
 2010–11 Saudi First Division
 2011 King Cup of Champions
 2010–11 Saudi Crown Prince Cup
 2012 AFC Champions League

References

External links 
 Saudi Arabia Football Federation
 Saudi League Statistics

2010-11
2010–11 in Asian association football leagues
Professional League